The 7th Parliament of Lower Canada was in session from December 12, 1810, to March 22, 1814. Elections to the Legislative Assembly in Lower Canada had been held in March 1810. All sessions were held at Quebec City.

References

External links 
  Assemblée nationale du Québec (French)
Journals of the House of Assembly of Lower Canada ..., John Neilson (1810)

07
1810 establishments in Lower Canada
1814 disestablishments in Lower Canada